Limnophyton is a genus in the family Alismataceae.  It includes five species from the Old World tropics. Three species are recognized as of May 2014:

Species
 Limnophyton angolense Buchenau in H.G.A.Engler - tropical Africa from Liberia to Sudan to Botswana
 Limnophyton fluitans Graebn. - Nigeria, Cameroon, Equatorial Guinea
 Limnophyton obtusifolium (L.) Miq. - Africa from Liberia to South Africa; Madagascar; India, Pakistan, Sri Lanka, Myanmar (Burma), Vietnam, Indonesia

References

Alismataceae
Alismataceae genera
Aquatic plants
Taxa named by Friedrich Anton Wilhelm Miquel